The 2012 Türk Telecom İzmir Cup was a professional tennis tournament played on hard courts. It was the fifth edition of the tournament which was part of the 2012 ATP Challenger Tour. It took place in İzmir, Turkey between 17 and 23 September 2012.

Singles main-draw entrants

Seeds

 1 Rankings are as of September 10, 2012.

Other entrants
The following players received wildcards into the singles main draw:
  Haluk Akkoyun
  Tuna Altuna
  Durukan Durmus
  Efe Yurtacan

The following players received a special exempt into the singles main draw:
  Tomislav Brkić

The following players received entry from the qualifying draw:
  Mirza Bašić
  James McGee
  Ruan Roelofse
  Luca Vanni

The following players received entry into the singles main draw as a lucky loser:
  Roman Borvanov

Champions

Singles

 Dmitry Tursunov def.  Illya Marchenko, 7–6(7–4), 6–7(5–7), 6–3

Doubles

 David Rice /  Sean Thornley def.  Brydan Klein /  Dane Propoggia, 7–6(10–8), 6–2

External links
Official Website